Kirils Tambijevs (born February 4, 1992 in Riga, Latvia) is a Latvian ice hockey forward, currently playing for HK Riga of Minor Hockey League. He has also played for Latvian National Junior team  His father is former Latvian national team player and current HK Riga coach Leonids Tambijevs.

References

1992 births
Living people
Ice hockey people from Riga
Latvian ice hockey forwards
HK Riga players